Odontosoria biflora is a species of fern in the family Lindsaeaceae. As with other species in the family, it has been placed in different genera; synonyms include Sphenomeris biflora and Sphenomeris chinensis ssp. biflora. It is native to Southeast China, Korea, Japan and its offshore islands, Taiwan, and the Philippines. The fronds are leathery in texture, with the final segments being wedge-shaped. In the northern Philippines, it is described as "common", being found on ridges and rocks at elevations of up to about 150 m.

Known in parts of the Philippines by the Ivatan name tubho, sun-dried leaves are used to make tubho tea.

References

Lindsaeaceae
Flora of Southeast China
Flora of Japan
Flora of Korea
Flora of Taiwan
Flora of the Philippines
Plants described in 1824